Vučedol is an archeological site, an elevated ground on the right bank of the river Danube near Vukovar that became the eponym of the eneolithic Vučedol culture.

It is estimated that the site had once been home to about 3,000 inhabitants, making it one of the largest and most important European centers of its time.

Artifacts from the Vučedol site are located in the Archaeological Museum in Zagreb, and the City museum of Vukovar. The site itself hosts the Vučedol Culture Museum since 2015.

Due to extremely favourable strategic position, Vučedol has always been open to colonization. The site is considerably larger than contemporary sites which indicates that it must have been a regional economic and social center. Some of the most important archaeological discoveries belonging to the Vučedol culture have been made at this site.

Archaeological research has confirmed finds of Baden culture, Vučedol culture as well as Kostolac culture on the site of Vučedol.

The highest part of the site at Vučedol was separated from the rest of the settlement by two parallel ditches. These ditches enclosed a large rectangular structure that was considerably larger than the houses located in surrounding residential areas, and this area also produced the only evidence of copper smelting on the site. Some scholars had argued that this part of the settlement may have been occupied by a local elite that exercised control not only over Vučedol but also over the production and exchange of precious goods and that dominated the smaller settlements in the area.

During the Battle of Vukovar in 1991, the Vučedol site was destroyed by being used as a firing base for the Serbian Yugoslav People's Army artillery and tanks in the three-month bombardment of Vukovar. The site was since restored and the Vučedol Culture Museum established on the grounds.

References

Archaeological sites in Croatia
Former populated places in the Balkans
Prehistoric sites in Croatia